Suceava County is a county of Romania. Most of its territory lies in the southern part of the historical region of Bukovina, while the remainder forms part of Western Moldavia proper. 

The county seat is the historical town of Suceava (historically known in Old High German as Sedschopff as well) which was the capital of the Principality of Moldavia during the late Middle Ages and then a pivotal, predominantly German-speaking commercial town of the Habsburg/Austrian Empire and Austria-Hungary at the border with the Kingdom of Romania throughout the late Modern Age up until 1918. 

Suceava County, as part of the historical and geographical region of Bukovina, had been sometimes described as 'Switzerland of the East'. It has also been known as 'Switzerland of Eastern Europe' in the minds of the educated public.

Demographics 

In 2011, as per the official census conducted that year, Suceava County had a population of 634,810, with a population density of 74/km2. The proportion of each constituent ethnic group is displayed below as follows, according to how they were officially recorded:

 Romanians - 96.14%
 Romani - 1.92%
 Ukrainians (including Hutsuls and Rusyns) - 0.92%
 Lipovans - 0.27%
 Germans (namely Bukovina Germans, Zipser Germans/Saxons, and Regat Germans) - 0.11%
 West Slavs (i.e. Poles, Slovaks, and Czechs) as well as minor other ethnic groups (including Hungarians or Szekelers) - 0.5%

Historical population in the 20th and 21st centuries

Geography 

Two thirds of the county lies within the southern part of the historical region of Bukovina, while the rest of it incorporates territories from Western Moldavia proper.

The western side of the county consists of mountains from the Eastern Carpathians group: the Rodna Mountains, the Rarău Mountains, the Giumalău Mountains, and the Ridges of Bukovina, the latter with lower heights.

The county's elevation decreases towards the east, with the lowest height in the Siret River valley. The rivers crossing the county are the Siret River with its tributaries: the Moldova, Suceava, and Bistrița rivers.

Neighbours 

The county of Suceava is bordered by the following other territorial units:

 Ukraine to the north - Chernivtsi Oblast.
 Mureș County, Harghita County, and Neamț County to the south.
 Botoșani County and Iași County to the east.
 Maramureș County and Bistrița-Năsăud County to the west.

Historical county 

In the Kingdom of Romania, between the early 20th century up to the end of the 1940s, the county had a smaller size and population. The contemporary Suceava county is the result of the merger of other smaller former Romanian counties from the historical province of Bukovina that were functional mostly throughout the interwar period (e.g. Rădăuți County or Câmpulung County).

The present-day Suceava County also incorporates part of Baia County. As per the administrative reform of 1938 under King Carol II, the whole counties which divided Bukovina in the Kingdom of Romania were united into a bigger land called Ținutul Suceava. Later, during World War II, Suceava County was part of the Bukovina Governorate of Romania.

As for the historical interwar Suceava County, this administrative unit was located in the northern part of Greater Romania and the southern part of the historical region of Bukovina respectively. Its territory is situated entirely within the borders of the current Suceava County, constituting thus the central-eastern part of the contemporary namesake county. During the interwar period, it was the smallest county of Greater Romania by area, covering .

During communism, Suceava County was at some point dissolved (as were all other counties in Romania as per the law no. 5 from 6 September 1950), then changed into the Suceava Region and then re-organized once again as county starting from 1968.

It is bordered on the east by the counties of Dorohoi and Botoșani, to the north by Rădăuți County, to the west by Câmpulung County, and to the south by Baia County.

Administrative organization 

As of 1930, the county was administratively subdivided into three districts (plăși):
Plasa Arbore, headquartered at Arbore
Plasa Dragomirna, headquartered at Dragomirna
Plasa Ilișești, headquartered at Ilișești

In 1938, the county was administratively reorganized into the following districts:
Plasa Arbore, headquartered at Solca (containing 15 villages)
Plasa Bosancea, headquartered at Bosancea (including 36 villages)
Plasa Ilișești, headquartered at Ilișești (including 17 villages)

Population 

According to the 1930 census data, the county population was 121,327, ethnically divided among Romanians (79.5%), Germans (primarily Bukovina Germans but also Zipsers) (8.2%), Jews (5.5%), Poles (2.7%), Ukrainians (1.7%), as well as other ethnic minorities.

By language the county was divided among Romanian (76.5%), German (9.4%), Ukrainian (5.5%), Yiddish (4.3%), Polish (2.5%), as well as other languages. From the religious point of view, the population consisted of Eastern Orthodox (80.1%), Roman Catholic (8.4%), Jewish (5.5%), Evangelical Lutheran (3.3%), Greek Catholic (1.4%), as well as other minor religions.

Urban population 

The county's urban population consisted of 19,850 inhabitants (17,028 in Suceava and 2,822 in Solca), ethnically divided among Romanians (61.5%), Jews (18.7%), Germans (13.9%), Poles (2.6%), as well as other ethnic minorities.

As a mother tongue in the urban population, Romanian (60.4%) predominated, followed by German (18.7%), Yiddish (13.8%), Ukrainian (3.2%), Polish (2.2%), as well as other minor spoken languages. From the religious point of view, the urban population consisted of 60.6% Eastern Orthodox, 18.8% Jewish, 15.3% Roman Catholic, 2.0% Greek Catholic, 1.7% Evangelical Lutheran, 0.7% Baptist as well as other confessional minorities.

Economy 

The predominant industries/economic sectors in the county are as follows:

 Lumber - producing the greatest land mass of forests in Romania;
 Food and Cooking;
 Mechanical components;
 Construction materials;
 Mining;
 Textile and leather;
 Tourism.

Suceava occupies the first place among the Romanian cities with the most commercial spaces per inhabitant.
Notable supermarket chains correlated with the aforementioned economic areas: Metro, Carrefour, Auchan, Selgros, Kaufland, and Lidl (some of the biggest supermarket chains in Romania).

In June 2022, it was reported that there are projects worth 1 billion EUR for the Suceava County from the PNRR/Next Generation EU plan by County Council president Gheorghe Flutur, former acting/ad interim president of the National Liberal Party (PNL).

Tourism 

In 2017, Suceava was ranked 3rd in Romania regarding the total tourist accommodation capacity, after Brașov and Constanța counties. Furthermore, one year later in 2018, Suceava County was designated "European destination of excellence" by the European Commission (EC).

The main tourist attractions of the county are:

 The town of Suceava with its medieval fortifications;
 The Painted churches of northern Moldavia and their monasteries:
 The Voroneț Monastery;
 The Putna Monastery;
 The Moldovița Monastery;
 The Sucevița Monastery;
 The Bogdana Monastery from Rădăuți;
 The Humor Monastery;
 The Arbore Monastery;
 The Probota Monastery;
 The Dragomirna Monastery;
  The medieval salt mine of Cacica;
 Mocăniță narrow-gauge steam train network, built during Austrian times, in the Moldovița commune and other rural parts of the county;
 The Vatra Dornei resort;
 The cities and towns of Rădăuți, Fălticeni, Câmpulung Moldovenesc, Gura Humorului, and Siret.

Politics and local administration

1992–1996 

The elected President of the County Council was Constantin Sofroni (FSN). The Suceava County Council, elected at the 1992 local elections, consisted of 45 councillors, with the following party composition:

1996–2000 

The elected President of the County Council was Gavril Mârza (PDSR). The Suceava County Council, elected at the 1996 local elections, consisted of 45 councillors, with the following party composition:

2000–2004 

The elected President of the County Council was Gavril Mârza (PDSR). The Suceava County Council, elected at the 2000 local elections, consisted of 45 councillors, with the following party composition:

2004–2008 

The elected President of the County Council was Gavril Mârza (PSD). The Suceava County Council, elected at the 2004 local elections, consisted of 37 councillors, with the following party composition:

2008–2012 

The elected President of the County Council was Gheorghe Flutur (PDL). The Suceava County Council, elected at the 2008 local elections, consisted of 36 councillors, with the following party composition:

2012–2016 

The elected President of the County Council was Cătălin Nechifor (PSD/USL). The Suceava County Council, elected at the 2012 local elections, consisted of 36 councillors, with the following party composition:

2016–2020 

The elected President of the County Council was Gheorghe Flutur (PNL). The Suceava County Council, elected at the 2016 local elections, consisted of 37 councillors, with the following party composition:

2020–2024 

The elected President of the County Council is Gheorghe Flutur (PNL). The Suceava County Council, renewed at the 2020 local elections, consists of 36 county councillors, with the following party composition:

Administrative divisions 

Suceava County has 5 municipalities, 11 towns, and 98 communes.

 Municipalities
 Câmpulung Moldovenesc
 Fălticeni
 Rădăuți
 Suceava - county seat; population within town limits: 124,161 (as of 2018)
 Vatra Dornei

 Towns
 Broșteni
 Cajvana
 Dolhasca
 Frasin
 Gura Humorului
 Liteni
 Milișăuți
 Salcea
 Siret
 Solca
 Vicovu de Sus

 Communes
 Adâncata
 Arbore
 Baia
 Bălăceana
 Bălcăuți
 Berchișești
 Bilca
 Bogdănești
 Boroaia
 Bosanci
 Botoșana
 Breaza
 Brodina
 Bunești
 Burla
 Cacica
 Calafindești
 Capu Câmpului
 Cârlibaba
 Ciocănești
 Ciprian Porumbescu
 Comănești
 Cornu Luncii
 Coșna
 Crucea
 Dărmănești
 Dolhești
 Dorna-Arini
 Dorna Candrenilor
 Dornești
 Drăgoiești
 Drăgușeni
 Dumbrăveni
 Fântâna Mare
 Fântânele
 Forăști
 Frătăuții Noi
 Frătăuții Vechi
 Frumosu
 Fundu Moldovei
 Gălănești
 Grămești
 Grănicești
 Hănțești
 Hârtop
 Horodnic de Jos
 Horodnic de Sus
 Horodniceni
 Iacobeni
 Iaslovăț
 Ilișești
 Ipotești
 Izvoarele Sucevei
 Mălini
 Mănăstirea Humorului
 Marginea
 Mitocu Dragomirnei
 Moara
 Moldova-Sulița
 Moldovița
 Mușenița
 Ostra
 Păltinoasa
 Panaci
 Pârteștii de Jos
 Pătrăuți
 Poiana Stampei
 Poieni-Solca
 Pojorâta
 Preutești
 Putna
 Rădășeni
 Râșca
 Sadova
 Șaru Dornei
 Satu Mare
 Șcheia
 Șerbăuți
 Siminicea
 Slatina
 Straja
 Stroiești
 Stulpicani
 Sucevița
 Todirești
 Udești
 Ulma
 Vadu Moldovei
 Valea Moldovei
 Vama
 Vatra Moldoviței
 Verești
 Vicovu de Jos
 Voitinel
 Volovăț
 Vulturești
 Zamostea
 Zvoriștea

 Villages
 Probota
 Solonețu Nou

2010 floods 
During June 2010, Gheorghe Flutur, at that time (as now) the president of Suceava County Council, stated in a Mediafax interview that his county was one of the worst hit in the country. In the morning of June 29, relief work was coordinated to deal with the flooding that killed 21 people and caused hundreds to be evacuated from their homes.

Gallery

Natives and residents 

 Anca Parghel - Romanian-Romani musician and jazz singer
 Matei Vișniec - Romanian-French playwright
 Nichita Danilov - Lipovan poet
 Iulian Vesper - Romanian poet and writer
 Nicolae Labiș - Romanian poet
 Grigore Vasiliu Birlic - Romanian actor
 Ion G. Sbiera - Romanian folklorist
 Ion Costist - Romanian 16th century Roman Catholic monk
 Liviu Giosan - Romanian-American marine geologist
 Elisabeta Lipă - Romanian Olympic rower
 Dorin Goian - Romanian football player
 Constantin Schumacher - Romanian-German footballer
 Józef Weber - German Roman Catholic archbishop
 Elisabeth Axmann - German writer
 Otto Babiasch - German Olympic boxer
 Lothar Würzel - German linguist, journalist, and politician
 George Ostafi - German abstract painter
 Hugo Weczerka - German historian and academician
 Anton Keschmann - German politician in the Imperial Austrian Parliament
 Olha Kobylianska - Ukrainian-German writer
 Ludwig Adolf Staufe-Simiginowicz - Ukrainian-German writer and educator
 George Löwendal - Russian-Danish painter

Notes

References

External links

 
Bukovina
Counties of Romania
1925 establishments in Romania
1938 disestablishments in Romania
States and territories disestablished in 1938
States and territories established in 1925
1940 establishments in Romania
1950 disestablishments in Romania
1968 establishments in Romania
States and territories established in 1940
States and territories disestablished in 1950
States and territories established in 1968